Nicholas Hayman (died 1606), of Totnes; later of Dartmouth, Devon, was an English merchant and politician.

He was a Member (MP) of the Parliament of England for Totnes in 1586 and for Dartmouth in 1593.

He was Mayor of Totnes in 1589–1590 and Mayor of Dartmouth between 1593 and 1602.

References

16th-century births
1606 deaths
Mayors of Totnes
Members of the Parliament of England (pre-1707) for Totnes
Members of the Parliament of England for Dartmouth
English MPs 1586–1587
English MPs 1593
Mayors of Dartmouth, Devon